The Hobgoblin (German: Der Klabautermann) is a 1924 German silent thriller film directed by Paul Merzbach and starring Evi Eva, Wilhelm Diegelmann and Harry Hardt. In Berlin it premiered at the Marmorhaus.

The film's art direction was by Botho Hoefer.

Cast
 Evi Eva as Marja  
 Wilhelm Diegelmann as William Russell  
 Harry Hardt as Holger, sein Neffe  
 Kläre Grieger
 Ludwig Andersen as Kapitän Leeds  
 Rolf Jäger as Francois Duval 
 Hans Trautner as Dr. Fred Maclin

References

Bibliography
 Grange, William. Cultural Chronicle of the Weimar Republic. Scarecrow Press, 2008.

External links

1924 films
Films of the Weimar Republic
Films directed by Paul Merzbach
German silent feature films
German thriller films
German black-and-white films
1920s thriller films
National Film films
Silent thriller films
1920s German films